Rayón Municipality is a municipality in Sonora in north-western Mexico.

The seat is in Rayón, Sonora.

Area and population

The municipal area is 1,106.54 km2 with a population of 1,591 registered in 2000.

Neighboring municipalities
Neighboring municipalities are:
Opodepe Municipality—north
Aconchi Municipality—east
Ures Municipality—southeast
San Miguel de Horcasitas Municipality—southwest
Carbó Municipality—west

References

Municipalities of Sonora